Legendary Dudas is an American comedy television series created by Kevin Jakubowski that aired on Nickelodeon from July 9 to August 13, 2016. The series stars Theodore Barnes and DeVion Harris.

Premise 
Sam and Tyler Duda, two brothers who couldn't be more different, end up in the same homeroom in middle-school when younger brother Sam skips sixth grade and is promoted to seventh grade with older brother Tyler.

Cast

Main 
 Theodore Barnes as Sam Duda
 DeVion Harris as Tyler Duda

Recurring 
 Jackson A. Dunn as Elmer
 Mylo Gosch as Neiderprum
 Pearce Joza as Logan
 Dallas Liu as Carter
 Meyrick Murphy as Dallas
 Daniella Perkins as Sophia
 Megan Richie as Gigi
 Laura Harman as Miss Tolomeo
 Kelly Perine as Principal Platt

Production 
The series, which was previously titled Homeroom and The Dudas, was picked up by Nickelodeon in March 2016.

Episodes

Ratings 
 
}}

References

External links 
 

2010s American children's comedy television series
2010s Nickelodeon original programming
2016 American television series debuts
2016 American television series endings
English-language television shows
Middle school television series
Television series about siblings